Forrest Warden Myers, also known as Frosty Myers (born 1941 in Long Beach, California) is an American sculptor. He is best known for his pieces Moon Museum (1969) and The Wall (1973), the latter being a monumental wall sculpture in the SoHo, Manhattan neighborhood of New York City. He lives and works in Brooklyn, New York and Damascus, Pennsylvania.

Biography 
Myers studied at the San Francisco Art Institute, from 1958 to 1960; and moved to New York City in 1961. During the early to mid-1960s he was a founding member of The Park Place Gallery. 

His large steel Untitled from 1969-1970 is included in the outdoor plaza at The Governor Nelson A. Rockefeller Empire State Plaza Art Collection in Albany, New York.

Myers life and career has been interviewed by national and international television personalities. The Art and Times of Frosty Myers, a feature length movie documenting his extraordinary life, is also a unique and fascinating window into the New York art scene of the 60s and 70s.

With his wife Debra Arch Myers, Frosty divides his time between homes in Damascus, Pennsylvania, where there is a large museum of his work, and St. Augustine, Florida.

References

External links

1941 births
Living people
20th-century American sculptors
San Francisco Art Institute alumni
People from Brooklyn
People from Long Beach, California
People from Wayne County, Pennsylvania
Date of birth missing (living people)
21st-century American sculptors